Vatican Cycling is the official governing body for the sport of cycling in the Vatican City.

History
Vatican Cycling became the a member of the International Cycling Union in September 2021. Vatican Cycling was the first sports federation from Vatican City to gain official membership of its sport's world governing body.

See also
Sport in Vatican City

References

National members of the European Cycling Union
Sport in Vatican City